Agathis kinabaluensis is a tree of Borneo in the conifer family Araucariaceae. The specific epithet  is from the Latin,  referring to the species being native to Mount Kinabalu in Sabah.

Description
Its bark is dark brown. The male cones are cylindrical in shape, the female ones ovoid.

Distribution and habitat
Agathis kinabaluensis is endemic to Borneo where it is confined to Mount Kinabalu in Sabah and Mount Murud in Sarawak, both protected areas.

References

kinabaluensis
Trees of Borneo
Endemic flora of Borneo
Plants described in 1979
Taxonomy articles created by Polbot
Taxa named by David John de Laubenfels
Flora of Mount Kinabalu
Flora of the Borneo montane rain forests